Elizabeth Amber is a romance novelist who has written the series of paranormal fiction books called The Lord Of Satyr.

Biography

Home Life

Elizabeth Amber's interest in Greco-Roman mythology inspired this series. She is an animal lover with two cats, who volunteers at a local no-kill animal shelter. Her other hobbies include cooking, shopping, and spending time with her mother and sister. She is now an art historian specializing in ancient Greco-Roman artifacts. She has visited Italy and Greece and had seen the monuments there which has developed her interests in mythology.

Writing career

Elizabeth Amber wrote this series of erotic historical paranormal romance novels based on her interest in Greco-Roman artifacts celebrating the grape harvest. Satyrs are the carnal followers of the wine god, Bacchus in ancient Roman mythology, and are depicted on many urns and amphorae found in Roman ruins.

In her novels, three half-satyr, half-human brothers own a lavish estate and vineyard in 1800s Tuscany, Italy, where they guard ancient secrets and conduct unusual rituals.  When a letter arrives instructing them to seek out three endangered half-faerie brides, they see it as an opportunity to sire heirs.  She wrote her first book, Nicholas,  and then went to a Romance Writers of America conference to learn where to submit her book. Kensington bought the series. Nicholas has been critically acclaimed by many reviewers and has been mentioned in Publishers Weekly.

Books

The Lords of Satyr
Nicholas, The Lords of Satyr (August 2007)
Raine, The Lords of Satyr (March 2008)
Lyon, The Lords of Satyr (October 2008)
 Dominic, The Lords of Satyr (March 2009)
Dane, The Lord of Satyr (June 2010)
Bastian, The Lord of Satyr (May 2011)
Sevin, The Lord of Satyr (May 2012)

References

External links 
 Official website
 Goodreads

Living people
Writers of books about writing fiction
American romantic fiction writers
Year of birth missing (living people)